In enzymology, a 4-oxoproline reductase is an enzyme that catalyzes the chemical reaction

4-oxo-L-proline + NADH + H+  cis-4-hydroxy-L-proline + NAD+

Thus, the three substrates of this enzyme are 4-oxo-L-proline, NADH, and H+, whereas its two products are cis-4-hydroxy-L-proline and NAD+.

This enzyme belongs to the family of oxidoreductases, specifically those acting on the CH-OH group of donor with NAD+ or NADP+ as acceptor. The systematic name of this enzyme class is 4-hydroxy-L-proline:NAD+ oxidoreductase. This enzyme is also called hydroxy-L-proline oxidase. This enzyme was originally thought to participate in the metabolism of arginine and proline. However, recent data show that it is unlikely since neither 4-oxo-L-proline nor cis-4-hydroxy-L-proline are metabolites of these metabolic pathways.

Gene 
The gene encoding 4-oxo-L-proline reductase was identified as 3-hydroxybutyrate dehydrogenase 2 (BDH2) by Sebastian Kwiatkowski and co-workers in 2022. The enzyme is a member of the Short-chain Dehydrogenases/Reductases (SDR) family of enzymes.

References

Further reading 

 

EC 1.1.1
NADH-dependent enzymes
Enzymes of unknown structure